The Britten-Norman BN-2 Islander is a British light utility aircraft and regional airliner designed and originally manufactured by Britten-Norman of the United Kingdom. Still in production, the Islander is one of the best-selling commercial aircraft types produced in Europe. Although designed in the 1960s, over 750 are still in service with commercial operators around the world. The aircraft is a light transport with over 30 military aviation operators around the world.

Initial aircraft were manufactured at Britten-Norman's factory in Bembridge, Isle of Wight, UK. After Fairey Aviation acquired the Britten-Norman company, its Islanders and Trislander aircraft were built in Romania, then shipped to Avions Fairey in Belgium for finishing before being flown to the UK for flight certification. The Islander has been in production for more than 50 years.

Development

Origins
In 1953, Britten-Norman was formed for the purpose of converting and operating agricultural aircraft, amongst other vehicles such as the Cushioncraft hovercraft. In 1963, the firm initiated development work upon what would become the Islander, having sensed a demand for a simple and inexpensive twin-piston engine aircraft. The founders, John Britten and Desmond Norman, had observed the rapid growth of the commuter airline sector, and concluded that capacity was of a higher value to these operators than either range or cruising speed, thus the Islander emphasized payload over either of these attributes.

Through the use of low wing- and span-loading to generate greater effectiveness than conventional counterparts, the Islander could lift considerably heavier payloads than the typical aircraft in its power, weight or cost classes. To reduce manufacturing costs, both the wings and tail surfaces maintain a constant chord and thickness, while the ribs within the aircraft's wing are all identical; both rivets and external fishplate joints are used for the same purpose. The type was originally intended to use a fabric-and-steel design. A light alloy monocoque approach was adopted instead. The structure is designed to give rise to and experience low levels of stress, and has an infinite fatigue life without testing.

On 13 June 1965, the first prototype BN-2 Islander conducted its maiden flight, powered by a pair of Rolls-Royce/Continental IO-360B piston engines; only four days later, the prototype appeared at the Paris Air Show. The IO-360B engines were later replaced by more powerful Lycoming O-540-E engines, which were located further outboard on the wings, for superior single-engine climb performance. On 20 August 1966, a second BN-2 prototype performed its first flight. These prototype aircraft, while resembling subsequent production models for the most part, were outfitted with different, less powerful engines. On 24 April 1967, the first production Islander performed its first flight; UK type certification was received in August 1967, US authorities also certified the type in December 1967.

Initial production of the Islander started at the Britten-Norman factory at Bembridge on the Isle of Wight; however, within a few years the company found that it could not produce the aircraft at a sufficient rate to keep up with the customer demand. To expand production, a contract was placed with Intreprinderea de Reparatii Material Aeronautic (IRMA) of Romania, initially to assemble kit-form aircraft, which were then sent to the UK for completion. In August 1969, the first Romanian-assembled Islander performed its first flight. IRMA proved successful at economically producing the aircraft, producing roughly 30-40 aircraft per year at times, and eventually became the primary manufacturing site for the Islander. In 1977, IRMA received a contract for the production of a further 100 Islanders; from that point on, the firm produced all subsequent Islander aircraft. More than 500 of the type were manufactured in Romania.

In 1970, a military version of the Islander, marketed as the Defender, conducted its first flight. Modifications included the addition of underwing hardpoints for armaments/equipment, and the main cabin area being fitted out for light troop transport and support aircraft duties. The Defender capitalised on the aircraft's rugged structure, making it suitable for long-term operations in developing countries. Purchases from police and military customers have typically been for use in surveillance and counter-terrorism operations. The Maritime Defender is another military version of the Islander, intended for search and rescue, coastal patrol and fishery protection.

Further development
Despite the relative success of the Islander, Britten-Norman experienced wider financial difficulties during the late 1960s, ultimately resulting in the company entering receivership in October 1971. In August 1972, Britten-Norman was purchased by the Fairey Aviation Group, forming the Fairey Britten-Norman company; shortly thereafter, the majority of manufacturing activity for both the Islander and Trislander was transferred to its Avions Fairey factory in Gosselies, Belgium. Completed aircraft were flown to Bembridge for final customer preparation prior to delivery.

Fairey Aviation set about the development of a more powerful model, the Turbo Islander, equipped with a pair of Lycoming LTP101 turboprop engines. However, testing revealed that the LTP101 engines were too powerful for the aircraft; thus, following a period of re-designing, the project evolved into the Turbine Islander (BN-2T), equipped with a pair of Allison 250 turboprop engines instead. However, Fairey encountered financial difficulty, resulting in the Fairey Britten-Norman company entering receivership and the firm's acquisition by Oerlikon Buerle of Switzerland, leading to the formation of Pilatus Britten-Norman, whereupon some production activity was transferred back to Bembridge.

Presently Talco in Texas holds the STC.

In 1969, an improved version, the BN-2A Islander, conducted its maiden flight. It incorporated aerodynamic and flight equipment improvements, such as lower-drag engine cowlings and undercarriage, an improved interior, and an expanded rear baggage area with external access. In 1970, to improve hot-and-high performance, more powerful Lycoming O-540-K1-B5 engines were made available, alongside optional tiptanks and an elongated nose to house baggage.

In 1977, a single standard BN-2 was refitted with Dowty Rotol ducted fans. The ducted fan produced less noise than conventional propeller propulsion. Some structural strengthening of the main wing spar at the root was required due to the extra weight. This aircraft was subject to 18 months of flying trials to test the suitability of the ducted fan as a means of reducing aircraft noise; these tests reportedly demonstrated a 20 decibel noise reduction as well as increased thrust and reduced pollution.

In 1978, a further improved version, the BN-2B Islander II, was produced as a result of a product improvement program. The BN-2B model involved several changes, including a redesigned cockpit and a reduction in cabin noise levels. In 1980, it was decided to make available turboprop engines for the type, adopting twin Allison 250-B17C engines; when the latter are installed, the aircraft is designated the BN-2T Turbine Islander. The first such BN-2T entered service in 1981.

In February 1999, the acquisition of Romaero, the Romanian manufacturer of the Islander, by Britten-Norman Group was announced. By May 2006, a greater sales emphasis was being placed upon the Defender over the Islander. In December 2006, aerospace publication Flight International observed that: "The only civil aircraft that remains in production in the UK is the tiny Britten-Norman Islander".

In early 2008, B-N was studying a version powered by  aircraft diesel engines with SMA Engines, already offering the  SMA SR305-230.
In May 2010, Britten-Norman announced that manufacturing of the Islander would be relocated from Romania to a new site in the UK, due to the rising costs of production in Romania.

Electric Project Fresson

Supported by Britten-Norman, Cranfield Aerospace wants to develop an electric propulsion system for the over 700 Islanders currently operated.

Trislander

In 1968, the original second Islander prototype was re-used for a further development programme, being modified into a stretched aircraft with greater capacity, referred to as the Super Islander. However, the Super Islander programme was aborted without proceeding to certification. The prototype later received further design changes to produce the three-engined version, the BN-2A Mk III Trislander. This aircraft has a stretched fuselage, modified landing gear and a third engine, which is mounted on the tail. On 11 September 1970, the Trislander prototype conducted its maiden flight, appearing at the 1970 Farnborough Air Show the same day.

Design

The Britten-Norman BN-2 Islander is a high-wing cantilever monoplane with a rectangular fuselage and two wing-mounted engines; early aircraft were equipped with a pair of piston engines while later production models may be alternatively fitted with turboprop engines in their place. The rectangular cross section fuselage, which is furnished with a conventional tail unit and fixed tricycle landing gear, typically accommodates a single pilot and up to nine passengers in a commuter configuration, each row being accessed by its own door; the cabin can be rapidly reconfigured, allowing for a single aircraft to undertake a diverse range of tasks within a minimal period of time. Often referring to the type as "The world's most versatile aircraft", Britten-Norman promotes the Islander's low direct operating costs, minimal maintenance, and its stability in flight as major attributes of the aircraft.

The original Islander was designed with an emphasis upon providing ease of access within the short haul sector to remote locations as a safe, efficient, and profitable transport aircraft. It has been regularly used by such operators, including the frequent use of unprepared rough airstrips and from challenging terrain; the Islander being capable of short takeoff and landing (STOL) operations. The low load height and wide side doors provide for easy access for passenger and cargo operations, while the aircraft's ability to maintain a high takeoff frequency has led to the type's use for parachuting. For operating within noise-sensitive environments, silencers can be equipped on both the aircraft's engine and propellers.

Designed as a small and inexpensive commuter/utility aircraft, various cabin configurations and equipment loadouts are available to suit a wide variety of different purposes, including charter flights, scheduled flights, agricultural uses, aerial firefighting, air freight VIP/executive transport, aerial surveillance, air ambulance, paradropping, and law enforcement. The design programme can be entirely personalized, allowing each customer to be involved in every area of the aircraft's manufacture to mold it to their preferences. Later versions of the Islander offer various options, including enlarged bay doors, 3-bladed scimitar propellers, low drag fairings, modern interior, ergonomic leather seating, in-flight entertainment systems, and alternative seat arrangements; underwing hardpoints can also be installed for carrying pod, spray booms and other external stores.

Operational history

Immediately following commercial availability, US distributor Jonas Aircraft ordered 30 Islanders, and placed orders for another 112 aircraft within a year. When equipped with four 54-gallon fuel tanks, the Islander was able to ferry itself across the transatlantic route, via Gander International Airport, Newfoundland, for US deliveries. The Islander's long-range capabilities were highlighted when the type won the 1969 London-Sydney air race.

In 1974, sales of the Islander surpassed the 548-order record for British multi-engine commercial aircraft. In 1982, another production milestone was reached with the delivery of the 1,000th Islander. From the 1980s onwards, sales noticeably declined; according to Britten-Norman Chief Executive William Hynett, this was due to the global market having become saturated by the type and there being only a low civil demand for additional aircraft, in part due to the longevity of in-service Islanders. As of 2016, Britten-Norman claim that the Islander is in daily service with roughly 500 operators in more than 120 countries.

Between 1976 and 2006, Scottish airline Loganair operated a number of Islanders as air ambulances, covering areas such as the island communities in the Hebrides.

Several commuter airlines and general aviation charter operators in the U.S. also flew the Islander including Stol Air Commuter in scheduled passenger service in northern California from their San Francisco International Airport (SFO) hub and Channel Islands Aviation in southern California which used the aircraft for the flights to Channel Islands National Park. Another U.S. commuter airline operator was Wings Airways which operated high frequency shuttle service into the Philadelphia International Airport (PHL).

By October 2019, 800 Islanders were in service including around 600 used for short flights.

Variants
Source:

BN-2
Prototype first flown in 1966 with two  Lycoming O-540-E4B5 piston engines.

BN-2A
Production version with minor modification from prototype and increased takeoff weight.

BN-2A-2
A BN-2A with modified flaps, and two  Lycoming IO-540-K1B5 (fuel injected) engines.

BN-2A-3
A BN-2A-2 with increased wingspan and fitted with extra wingtip fuel tanks.

BN-2A-6
A BN-2A with wing leading edge modifications and two  Lycoming O-540-E4C5 engine.

BN-2A-7
A BN-2A-6 with increased wingspan and fuel capacity.

BN-2A-8
A BN-2A-6 with droop flaps.

BN-2A-9
A BN-2A-7 with droop flaps.

BN-2A-10
A BN-2A-8 with increased takeoff weight and  Lycoming TIO-540-H1A (turbo-charged, fuel injected) engines.

BN-2A-20
A BN-2A-2 with increased takeoff weight and minor improvements.

A BN-2A-3 with increased takeoff weight.

BN-2A-23
A BN-2A-21 with lengthened nose.

BN-2A-24
A BN-2A-26 with lengthened nose.

BN-2A-25
A BN-2A-27 with lengthened nose.

BN-2A-26
A BN-2A-8 with increased takeoff weight.

A BN-2A-9 with increased takeoff weight.

BN-2A-30
A BN-2A-20 fitted with floats. Twin floats were attached to the undercarriage legs and incorporated retractable landing gear.

BN-2A-41
Turbo Islander with lengthened nose, droop flaps and two Lycoming LTP-101 turboprops, first flown in 1977.

Britten-Norman BN-2B Defender

Defender military variant with  IO-540-K1B5 engines and underwing hard points and military modifications.

BN-2B-20
A BN-2A-20 with improved soundproofing and increased landing weight and other minor modifications.

BN-2B-21
A BN-2A-21 with Model B improvements.

A BN-2A-26 with Model B improvements.

BN-2B-27
A BN-2A-27 with Model B improvements.

BN-2T
Turbine Islander based on BN-2A-26 with two  Allison 250-B17C turboprops.  Seating for up to 9 passengers.

Islander AL1
Variant of the BN-2T for communications and reconnaissance duties with the British Army; seven built. Used for aerial reconnaissance and photography in Northern Ireland during Operation Banner by No. 1 Flight Army Air Corps based at Aldergrove. 1 Flight was later integrated into No. 651 Squadron. Redesignated Islander R1 in 2019 after being transferred to the Royal Air Force.

Islander CC2 and CC2A
Variant of the BN-2T for the Royal Air Force; three operated. These aircraft were retired from the RAF in 2017.

Maritime-Defender
Armed maritime reconnaissance and patrol aircraft.

BN-2A-III Trislander
Three-engined Trislander, a stretched BN-2A with 18 seats and three  Lycoming O-540-E4C5 piston engines.

Operators

Military and government

Civilian

Former operators

Accidents

 1980 Flugfélag Austurlands Islander accident - On 22 september 1980 a Britten Norman BN2-a Islander flew into fog and crashed into Smjörfjöll mountain region in east Iceland killing three on board. 
 1996 Loganair Islander accident
 2005 Loganair Islander accident
 2009 Divi Divi Airlines crash on Oct 22, flight 14 had one pilot fatality, while 9 passengers were rescued after water landing due to engine failure near Bonair Island.
 2005 L.A.B. Flying Service accident
 2014 Romania Britten-Norman Islander crash
 2016 Sunbird Aviation crash
2021 Island Airways crash -  On 13 November 2021, a Britten-Norman BN-2A Islander crashed while attempting to land at Welke Airport on Beaver Island, Charlevoix County, Michigan. Four deaths were reported.
2022 Air Flamenco crash - On 15 February 2022, a Britten-Norman BN-2A Islander (N821RR) veered off the runway at Culebra Airport (CPX), Puerto Rico doing substantial right wing and propeller damage. None of the 3 persons on board were injured.

Specifications (BN-2B Islander)

See also

References

Citations

Bibliography
 BN Historians: Islander 2005 – BN-2 Production History, chapter Operators Index. Staines, Middlesex 2005, pp. 139–171.
 
 
 
 .
 
 

 
 Nikolaus Krivinyi: Warplanes of the World 1983/84. Bernard & Graefe Verlag, Koblenz 1983, ISBN 3-7637-5181-5.
 Nikolaus Krivinyi: Warplanes of the World 1994/95. Bernard & Graefe Verlag, Koblenz 1994, ISBN 3-7637-5922-0.

External links

 
 

1960s British civil utility aircraft
Islander
Aircraft first flown in 1965
1960s British airliners
High-wing aircraft
STOL aircraft
Twin piston-engined tractor aircraft
Aircraft operated by the Antigua and Barbuda Defence Force Air Wing